San Miguel de Salinas is a town and municipality in the Valencian Community (Spain), situated in the south of the province of Alicante; in the comarca of Vega Baja del Segura. In the 2006 census, the population was 7,104.

Location and Geography
Located between Torrevieja and Murcia, San Miguel de Salinas is the highest town in the comarca. Its area (54 km²) descends from the mountain with many streams and gullies leading to the plain, known as El Llano, where the salt lakes are found. Local roads connect the town with Orihuela, Bigastro, Torrevieja and other towns in the area.
From Alicante and Cartagena, the town can be accessed via the A-7 (E15) and AP-7 then the CV-940 and CV-941.

History
It is thought that settlement began in the area during Roman times, at a place known as Nisdomia. The area has always been connected to the Orihuela district but in 1836 the town's urban area was separated from it and in 1955 the municipal boundary was extended into the country to form an imaginary triangle between the Pedrera Reservoir, the Torrevieja lagoon and La Peña del Águila.

References

External links
 Town Hall of San Miguel de Salinas

Municipalities in the Province of Alicante
Vega Baja del Segura